A triptych is a work of art that is divided into three sections.

Triptych or The Triptych may also refer to:

Literature 
 Triptych (Frey novel), a 2011 novel by J. M. Frey
 Triptych (Slaughter novel), a 2006 novel by Karin Slaughter
 Triptych, a 2008 novel by Wendy Coakley-Thompson

Music and dance 
 Triptych (ballet), a 2000 ballet by Christopher d'Amboise
 Triptych (Puccini) (Il trittico), a 1918 collection of three one-act operas by Puccini
 Triptych (7" vinyl), a 1982 single by Bryn Jones
 "Triptych", a song by Roxy Music from Country Life
 "Triptych", a song by Arcane Roots from Blood & Chemistry
 "Triptych I-III", a sequence of songs by Celtic Frost from Monotheist
 "BTS Cypher Part 2: Triptych", a song by BTS from Skool Luv Affair

Albums 
 Triptych (Bloodrock album), 2000
 Triptych (Lotte Anker album), 2005
 Triptych (Shooting at Unarmed Men album), 2007
 Triptych (The Tea Party album), 1999
 The Triptych, a 2005 album by Demon Hunter
 The Triptych, a 2007 album by Fred Deakin of Lemon Jelly

Other media 
 Triptych, May–June 1973, a painting by Francis Bacon
 Triptych (film), a 2013 Canadian film
 "Triptych", an episode of the podcast Welcome to Night Vale

Other uses 
 Triptych (horse) (1982-1989), a Thoroughbred racehorse
 Triptych (philately), a set of three adjacent postage stamps of related design

See also
 :Category:Triptychs
 TripTik, an annotated automobile map
 Triptykon, a Swiss extreme metal band
 Trilogy, a set of three related works of art
 Tryptych (album), by Demdike Stare